The Buffalo Ballet Theater is a Ballet company in Buffalo, New York, USA. It was founded by the dancer and choreographer Barry Leon. Bronislava Nijinska led the Buffalo Ballet Theater from 1967.
Countless US-American dancers started their dancing career here.

Principal Dancers 
 Donna Armistead 
Robin Gilbert
 Heidi Halt
 Janet Murphy
 Moira Murphy
 Gregory Drotar
 Barry Leon

Dancers 
 Marvin Askew 
 Amber Bosch 
 Ani DiFranco
 Sarah Duax 
 Sara Eppley 
 Rebekah Fontane 
 Sara Gelbaugh 
 Heidi Halt 
 Erinn Hughes 
 Rebecca Jefferson 
Heidi Kregal
 Linda Merrill
 Melanie Nasser 
 Libby Nord 
 Noelle Partusch 
 Kathy Pucci 
 Maria Rodgers 
 Christopher Smith 
 Joel Sprague
 Joseph Puleo
 Janette Sullivan 
 Katie Wakeford
 Paul Wegner 
 Jessica Wolfrum

Artistic Directors 
 Gregory Drotar 
 Barry Leon

Choreographers 
 Gregory Drotar
 Shelley Hain

Teachers 
Patricia Farkas Sprague
 Linda Perez

Pianists 
 Doris Parsons

References 

Culture of Buffalo, New York
Dance companies in New York (state)
Ballet companies in the United States